Susannah of the Mounties is a children's novel by Canadian author Muriel Denison, first published in 1936. In the book 9-year-old Susannah is sent to Regina, Saskatchewan to spend the summer with her uncle who is a Mountie. There are several sequels to the book: Susannah at Boarding School, Susannah of the Yukon and Susannah Rides Again.

Film adaptation

In 1939 it was adapted into the film Susannah of the Mounties starring Shirley Temple as Susannah. The movie plot differs significantly from the book: it is set twenty years earlier at a much smaller Mounted Police fort and Susannah's parents are dead rather than in India, while the character of the uncle is omitted. The film is a U.S. version of the West rather than the Canadian West of the book.

References

External links

 

1936 Canadian novels
1936 children's books
Canadian children's novels
Series of children's books
Novels set in Saskatchewan
Fiction set in the 1890s
Canadian novels adapted into films
Royal Canadian Mounted Police in fiction
J. M. Dent books